Rosa (Chinese: 神勇雙響炮續集) is a 1986 Hong Kong action comedy film directed by Joe Cheung and starring Yuen Biao, Lowell Lo, Luk Siu-fan, Kara Hui and Paul Chun. The film's Chinese title literally means Supernaturally brave artillery sequel, which is also the Chinese title of the 1984 film, Pom Pom. Despite this, Rosa is not a sequel to Pom Pom like its Chinese title suggests.

Plot
Ha, nicknamed "Little Monster" (Yuen Biao), is an elite member of the Criminal Investigation Division (CID) of the Royal Hong Kong Police Force. One time while arresting a criminal, Ha accidentally humiliates Chief Inspector Tin (Paul Chun), whom is demoted as a result. Lui Kung (Lowell Lo), another CID officer, causes Tin's wife to give birth prematurely in a car accident while chasing criminals. Later, Ha and Kung were transferred to the Case Analysis Division, where they are supervised by Tin. Kung has a younger sister, Lui Lui (Kara Hui), whom he cares for and treasures deeply and he does not allow anyone to pursue her. However, due to coincidences, Ha gets to know Lui and they develop a romantic relationship, much to the displeasure of Kung. Later, Ha and Kung work together to capture Lee Wai-fung (Charlie Cho), a former undercover cop who has gone rogue and becoming the biggest drug trafficker in Asia.

Cast
Yuen Biao as 'Little Monster' Ha
Lowell Lo as 'Mustache' Lui Kung
Luk Siu-fan as Rosa
Kara Hui as Lui Lui
Paul Chun as Tin
James Tien as Wong Ping-tong
Charlie Cho as Lee Wai-fung
Dick Wei as Tong's assistant in white suit
Chung Fat as Tong's assistant in black suit
Huang Ha as Chiu Chow-hon
Ban Yun-sang as Roger
Billy Ching as Siu Ba-wong
Hsu Hsia as Boss Ho
Ka Lee as Traffic cop
Yuen Miu as Policeman
Peter Chan as Loanshark Choi's sun
Blackie Ko as Jeep driver who beat red traffic-light
Tai Po as Police agent Moore
Fung King-man as Loanshark Choi
Tai San as Man wearing black gloves in restaurant
Chan Chuen as King Pickpocket
Felix Lok as Car dealer
Chu Tau as Criminal Hung
Pan Yun-cheung as Policeman
Cheung Yun-cheung as In-law Chung 
Yuen Sai-kwan as Robber
Albert Lo as Siu Kai
Yau Pui-ling as Mrs. Tin
Chui Chung-hok as One of Loanshark Choi's men
Sze Gai-keung as Fat Lion
Lee Chuen-sing as Hospital doctor
Chan Ming-wai
Cheung Wing-hon
Tse Fook-yiu as One of Loanshark Choi's men
Lung Ying
Lam Foo-wai
Chun Kwai-bo
Chang Sing-kwong
Wong Kim-ban

Theme song
Capture My Heart (俘擄我的心)
Composer/Singer: Lowell Lo
Lyricist: Cheng Kwok-kong

Reception

Critical
Andrew Saroch of Far East Films rated the film 4.5 out of 5 stars praising the film as entertaining despite its simple story and its action scenes and humor.

Box office
The film grossed HK$11,108,518 at the Hong Kong box office during its theatrical run from 20 June to 2 July 1986 in Hong Kong.

See also
Sammo Hung filmography
Yuen Biao filmography

References

External links

Rosa at Hong Kong Cinemagic

1986 films
1980s action comedy films
1980s buddy films
1986 martial arts films
1980s crime comedy films
Hong Kong action comedy films
Hong Kong buddy films
Hong Kong martial arts films
Police detective films
Hong Kong slapstick comedy films
1980s Cantonese-language films
Golden Harvest films
Films set in Hong Kong
Films shot in Hong Kong
Hong Kong martial arts comedy films
1986 comedy films
1980s Hong Kong films